Che Jun (born July 1955) is a Chinese politician, serving since 2017 as the Communist Party Secretary of Zhejiang. Between 2016 and 2017, he served as Governor of Zhejiang. Che began his career in Anhui province, and rose to prominence taking charge of Shijiazhuang in the aftermath of the Chinese milk scandal and being dispatched to Xinjiang following the July 2009 Ürümqi riots.

Biography
Che was born in Chaohu, Anhui province. He joined the Chinese Communist Party in December 1973. He obtained an economic administration degree from the Central Party School.

Che began his career in his native Anhui province, first working for the Hefei Intermediate People's Court as a legal assistant, then deputy president and president of the court. In 1989, he entered the Hefei city government, and became the city's police chief. He was then named mayor of Hefei. In 2001, he was named party chief of Hefei.

In 2005, Che left his native province to work in Hebei as the head of the provincial Political and Legal Affairs Commission. A year later, he was named Organization Department head of Hebei province. In May 2008, he became Deputy Party Secretary of Hebei. In August 2008, due to the Chinese milk scandal which originated in products of Sanlu, headquartered in the capital of Hebei, Shijiazhuang, Che was named party chief of Shijiazhuang, replacing Wu Xianguo who was dismissed due to the scandal.

In May 2010, Che headed to the far west region of Xinjiang, becoming Deputy Party Secretary, the Political Commissar of the Xinjiang Production and Construction Corps, and chief executive of the China Xinjian Group Corporation. In September 2010 he was confirmed as a provincial-level official. On April 30, 2015, Che was relieved of his position as Political Commissar of the Xinjiang Production and Construction Corps; he has since then held only one office - that of deputy party chief of Xinjiang.

On July 4, 2016, Che was transferred out of Xinjiang and headed back east, where he became acting Governor of Zhejiang; he was duly confirmed as governor on January 20, 2017. In April 2017, Che was appointed as the Communist Party Secretary of Zhejiang.

On October 17, 2020, Che was appointed as the Deputy Chairperson of the National People's Congress Supervisory and Judicial Affairs Committee.

Che has been an alternate member of the 17th Central Committee of the Chinese Communist Party, and a full member of the 18th and 19th Central Committees.

References 

Living people
1955 births
Governors of Zhejiang
Chinese Communist Party politicians from Anhui
People's Republic of China politicians from Anhui
People from Chaohu
Members of the 18th Central Committee of the Chinese Communist Party
Alternate members of the 17th Central Committee of the Chinese Communist Party
Chinese police officers
Members of the 19th Central Committee of the Chinese Communist Party
Delegates to the 13th National People's Congress
Politicians from Hefei